Endothenia pullana, the woundwort marble, is a moth of the family Tortricidae. It was described by Adrian Hardy Haworth in 1811. It is found in north-western Europe, Sweden, Finland, Austria, Slovakia, Ukraine, Belarus and Russia. The habitat consists of marshy areas.

The wingspan is 10–14 mm. Adults are on wing from late May to July.

The larvae feed on Stachys palustris. They live in the stems and rootstock of their host plant. Pupation takes place in the stem within a reddish-brown silken cocoon.

References

Moths described in 1811
Endotheniini
Moths of Europe